

Legend

List

References

1990-91